KDT Nacional is a Peruvian football club, playing in the city of Callao, Lima, Peru.
From 1986 to 1990 KDT Nacional had the first female chairman in Perú's sports history Rosa Ana Berríos Orúe Pochita Berrios, who took the club to its first championship in more than 22 years.

History
The club was 1961 and 1967 Peruvian Segunda División champion.

The club have played at the highest level of Peruvian football on five occasions, from 1962 Peruvian Primera División until 1964 Peruvian Primera División and then in the newly created Torneo Descentralizado from 1968 to 1969 when the club was relegated.

Honours

National
Peruvian Segunda División:
Winners (2): 1961, 1967
Runner-up (2): 1954, 1959

Regional
Liga Regional de Lima y Callao:
Winners (1): 1950
Runner-up (2): 1946, 1947

Liga Departamental del Callao:
Winners (1): 1987

Liga Distrital del Callao:
Winners (1): 1987
Runner-up (2): 1990, 2016

See also
List of football clubs in Peru
Peruvian football league system

External links
 KDT Nacional fundado en 1931
 Segunda Division champions

Football clubs in Peru
Association football clubs established in 1931